Daniel Goh Pei Siong (born 1973) is a Singaporean sociologist and former politician. A former member of the opposition Workers' Party, he was a Non-Constituency Member of the 13th Parliament of Singapore between 2016 and 2020. 

A sociologist by profession, Goh's research interests focuses on political sociology, urban sociology, cultural studies, sociology of religion, and sociology of ethnic and multicultural relations. 

Goh did not participate in the 2020 general election citing health reasons.

Education 
Goh studied at St Joseph's Institution and completed his undergraduate and graduate studies in Sociology at the National University of Singapore. He was then awarded the International Institute Fellowship, Department of Sociology Teaching Fellowship and the Rackham Graduate Fellowship to pursue his doctoral study in sociology at the University of Michigan in Ann Arbor from 2000 to 2005.

Academic career 
On his return to the National University of Singapore in 2005, he was appointed assistant professor at the Department of Sociology. In 2012, he was awarded tenure and promoted to associate professor. He is currently the Associate Provost of Undergraduate Education. He is previously deputy head of the Department of Sociology and the convener of the Cultural Studies Minor and Cultural Studies in Asia PhD Programme.

Political career 
Goh has been a supporter of the Workers' Party since 1988, when he attended his first political rally at Eunos. He started volunteering with the Workers' Party in the 2011 General Election and joined as a member in 2013. He began his formal political career when he contested in the four-member team of the Worker's Party for East Coast Group Representation Constituency in the 2015 General Election. Although his team lost with 39.27% of the votes  as the best performing defeated team, he filled the NCMP seat that was offered to but turned down by former Punggol East Member of Parliament Lee Li Lian. He was a Non-constituency Member of Parliament (NCMP) of the 13th Parliament of Singapore from 29 February 2016 to 22 June 2020.

During a parliamentary debate on 26 February 2019, Goh asked for the retirement age to be removed so that workers can age with dignity and independence. He added that this move helps "to reform the system so that Singaporeans do not have to worry about their finances and can retire in their 60s if they want to, but they can also continue to work if they want to."

On 21 April 2020, the Workers' Party announced that due to a health condition, Goh would not run in the upcoming general election and would resign from various party posts except from the central executive council. On 27 December 2020, Goh's term in the CEC expired when a new CEC was chosen.

References 

1973 births
Singaporean Non-constituency Members of Parliament
Members of the Parliament of Singapore
Workers' Party (Singapore) politicians
National University of Singapore alumni
Living people
University of Michigan alumni